Baddam Narsimha Reddy ( 21 June 1931, Nakrekal, Nalgonda district, (Andhra Pradesh)) is a leader of Indian National Congress from Andhra Pradesh. He served as member of the Lok Sabha representing Miryalguda (Lok Sabha constituency). He was elected to 9th, 11th and 12th Lok Sabha.

References

India MPs 1989–1991
People from Nalgonda district
1931 births
Living people
Indian National Congress politicians
India MPs 1996–1997
India MPs 1998–1999
Lok Sabha members from Andhra Pradesh
Indian National Congress politicians from Andhra Pradesh